Jefferson Davis Cohn (1881–1951) was a British American publisher and horse breeder. He was the godson of Jefferson Davis.

In 1914, he bought the racehorse Teddy from Edmond Blanc for 5,400 francs.

He was married firstly to Florence, daughter of the Member of Parliament, financier and swindler Horatio Bottomley, and secondly, in 1921, to Marcelle Chantal.

References 

1881 births
1951 deaths
American racehorse owners and breeders
Businesspeople from London
20th-century English businesspeople
British emigrants to the United States